Charles MacIver (28 November 1866 – 21 December 1935) was a British sailor who competed in the 1908 Summer Olympics. He was a crew member of the British boat Mouchette, which won the silver medal in the 12 metre class.

References

External links 
 
 

1866 births
1935 deaths
British male sailors (sport)
Sailors at the 1908 Summer Olympics – 12 Metre
Olympic sailors of Great Britain
Olympic silver medallists for Great Britain
Olympic medalists in sailing
Medalists at the 1908 Summer Olympics